Ísold Uggadóttir is an Icelandic film director and screenwriter. She is known for her feature film debut in And Breathe Normally, for which she won the World Cinema Dramatic Directing Award at the 2018 Sundance Film Festival.

Life and career
Ísold was born in Reykjavík. She earned her M.F.A. in directing and screenwriting from Columbia University School of the Arts. Her directorial debut short film, Family Reunion (Góðir gestir), was an official selection of the 2007 Sundance Film Festival. She subsequently directed the short films Committed (Njálsgata), Clean and Revolution Reykjavík (Útrás Reykjavík).

Ísold's debut feature film And Breathe Normally, premiered at the Sundance Film Festival in 2018 and later released on Netflix in January 2019.

Filmography

Awards and nominations

References

External links

Living people
Halldór Laxness
Ísold Uggadóttir
Ísold Uggadóttirs
Ísold Uggadóttir
Ísold Uggadóttir
Year of birth missing (living people)
Ísold Uggadóttir
21st-century screenwriters
Ísold Uggadóttir
Sundance Film Festival award winners